Charlotte Hall Dos Santos (born 1990 in Oslo, Norway) is a Brazilian-Norwegian jazz singer, composer, and arranger, currently based in Berlin.

Biography 
Dos Santos grew up in Bærum with a Norwegian mother and Brazilian father. She attended jazz studies at the Berklee College of Music in Boston, Massachusetts (2013–16), where she earned a Bachelor of Music in Contemporary Writing and Production, and Vocal Jazz Performance. Her music mixes, “South-American traditions, jazz, neo soul, and tasty beats, with music history samples in a colorful way“. Dos Santos released her solo EP Cleo in 2017 on the label Fresh Selects. The EP was received positively in Norwegian media.

Discography 
 2017: Cleo (Fresh Selects)
 2022: Morfo (Because Music)

References

External links 
 Charlotte Dos Santos at SoundCloud
 Charlotte Dos Santos "Red Clay"

1990 births
Living people
Musicians from Bærum
Norwegian people of Brazilian descent
Norwegian jazz composers
Norwegian jazz singers
Women jazz composers
21st-century Norwegian singers
21st-century Norwegian women singers